Persoonia microphylla is a plant in the family Proteaceae and is endemic to New South Wales.

Description
Flowering occurs from December to February and the fruit is a green drupe with purple stripes.

Taxonomy
Persoonia microphylla was first formally described in 1830 by Robert Brown in the 1830 supplement to his Prodromus from specimens collected in 1823 near Port Jackson by "D. Cunningham".

Distribution and habitat

References

microphylla
Flora of New South Wales
Proteales of Australia
Plants described in 1830
Taxa named by Robert Brown (botanist, born 1773)